The Lake City Water Standpipe is a historic structure located in Lake City, Iowa, United States. The standpipe was a popular form of water tower from about 1860 to the turn of the 20th-century. The city council first attempted to build it as early as 1890, but the $10,000 bond was rejected. An $8,000 bond issue passed in June 1893, and a Water Works Department was established. It was completed in November 1893. Water mains were laid the following year and water was delivered to most citizens of Lake City. It also allowed the city to provide adequate fire protection. A new water tank was built next to the standpipe in the 1920s. It has subsequently been replaced by a larger structure on the southeast side of town. The standpipe was listed on the National Register of Historic Places in 1990.

References

Buildings and structures completed in 1893
Lake City, Iowa
Water towers in Iowa
Buildings and structures in Calhoun County, Iowa
National Register of Historic Places in Calhoun County, Iowa
Water towers on the National Register of Historic Places in Iowa